Wuntho or Waing Hso was a native state of Upper Burma when Burma (Myanmar), was under British control.

History
Wuntho state was founded before 1200. 
In 1885 the British annexed Upper Burma and established their rule in the region. Wuntho rebelled in 1891 but the British quelled the uprising. As a consequence a force of 1,800 British soldiers under General Sir George Wolseley occupied the town of Wuntho. In 1892 the state was formally annexed by the British and incorporated into the District of Katha. In 22,December 2018, Wuntho was incorporated into Kawlin District along with Kawlin and Pinlebu. It was classed by the Burmese as a Shan state, but was never on the same footing as the Shan states to the east.

Rulers
The rulers of Wuntho bore the title Saopha.

 941–955 Sao Hon Hpa
 955–?? Paung Hpa
 1382–1384 Paung Kiao
 1384–1414 Paung Hkam
 1414–1434 Hso Hkloung Hpa
 1434–1465 Saw Nyi
 1465–1481 Hso Wen Hpa
 1481–1504 Hso Paad Hpa
 1504–1534 Hso Hkam Hpa
 1534–1558 Soi Lod Hpa
 1558–1583 Tian Sieng Hpa
 1583–1592 Pha Lod Hpa from Kyawkku Hsiwan (Kyaukku, Myinkyadu)
 1592–1599 Town Hso Yen
 1599–1619 Tein-nyin-sa Saing Hkan
 1619–16?? Thakin Kaw Nyo
 16??–1647 Sao Inn Möng
 1647–1671 Kruea Hsan Hpa (come from Mongsit)
1671–1697 Kye Möng U Kyaung (Son of Kruea Hsan Hpa)
 1697–1697 Maung Kyin Baw
 1697–1702 Maung Sun
 1702–1714 Kyaung Pyn
 1714–1736 Mei Kiao (Son of Kye Möng U Kyaung)
 1736–1751 Vacant
 1751–1756 Talaings
 1756–1778 Okka Nara (Brother of Mei Kiao)
 1778–1796 Sao Tim Hpa
 1796–1798 Town San Hkam (Brother of Sao Tim Hpa)
 1798–1827 Maung Tha Ywe (administrator to 1802)
 1827–1830 Hkam Thaan Hpa
 1830–1833 Hso Ngaan Hpa
 1833–1849 Haw Hkam Hung Thit
 1849–1851 San Thit Hpa
 1852–1866 Hkam Thad Hpa (d. af.1891)
 1866–1878 Hso Hon Hpa
 1878– 7 Feb 1891 Hso U (Son of Hkam Tha Hpa) – Last Saopha of Waing Hso (b. 1857 - d. af.1909)

References

External links
Satellite map of Wuntho Maplandia
The Wuntho Sawbwa's troops surrendering arms to the British authorities at Wuntho - photo University of Cambridge

History of Myanmar
British Empire
Shan States